Cyril Eric George Humphrey (20 November 1900 – 16 April 1929) was an Australian rules footballer who played with Carlton in the Victorian Football League (VFL).

Notes

External links 

Eric Humphrey's profile at Blueseum

1900 births
1929 deaths
Australian rules footballers from Victoria (Australia)
Australian Rules footballers: place kick exponents
Carlton Football Club players